This list of gastropods described in 2013 is a list of new taxa of snails and slugs of every kind that have been described (following the rules of the ICZN) during the year 2013. The list only includes taxa at the level of genus or species. For changes in taxonomy above the level of genus, see Changes in the taxonomy of gastropods since 2005.

Fossil gastropods 

Anulifera chubutensis Ferrari, 2013
 Architectonica bajaensis Perrilliat, 2013
 Architectonica bieleri Perrilliat, 2013
 Asmunda rebjongensis Robba, 2013
 Bacteridiella saurini Robba, 2013
 Bania obliquaecostata  Neubauer, Mandic, Harzhauser & Hrvatović, 2013
 Bartschella karasensis Robba, 2013
 Besla tawunensis Robba, 2013
 Besla unicincta Robba, 2013
 Calyptraphorus terrysmithae Perrilliat, 2013
 Campanile zakhoense Harzhauser, Hoşgör & Pacaud, 2013
 Chrysallida reticulata Robba, 2013
 Colpomphalus spiralocostatus Gründel & Kollmann, 2013
 Costosyrnola rebjongensis Robba, 2013
 Cyclostremiscus petiti Perrilliat, 2013
 Egila garudai Robba, 2013
 Egilina karasensis Robba, 2013
 Eoborus fusiforme Salvador & Simone, 2013
 Eulimella latemarginata Robba, 2013
 Eulimella lawsi Robba, 2013
 Eulimella rembangensis Robba, 2013
 Eunerinea mendozana Cataldo, 2013
 Exesilla langhiana Robba, 2013
 Exesilla striata Robba, 2013
 "Faunus" dominicii Harzhauser, Hoşgör & Pacaud, 2013
Gastrocopta itaboraiensis Salvador & Simone, 2013
 Koloonella rebjongensis Robba, 2013
 Lacunaria carrenoae Perrilliat, 2013
 Leucotina rebjongensis Robba, 2013
 Levipyrgulina levisculpta Robba, 2013
 Liamorpha minuta Robba, 2013
 Liamorpha rembangensis Robba, 2013
 Linopyrga gradata Robba, 2013
 Linopyrga marcoi Robba, 2013
 Longchaeus schepmani Robba, 2013
 Margarya nanningensis Ying, Fürsich & Schneider, 2013
 Megastomia gradata Robba, 2013
 Megastomia tawunensis Robba, 2013
 Melanopsis corici Neubauer, Mandic, Harzhauser & Hrvatović, 2013
 Melanopsis medinae Neubauer, Mandic, Harzhauser & Hrvatović, 2013
 Menesthella bicarinata Robba, 2013
 Menesthella javanensis Robba, 2013
 Menesthella matteoi Robba, 2013
 Nematurella vrabaci Neubauer, Mandic, Harzhauser & Hrvatović, 2013
 Nisiturris columellaris Robba, 2013
 Nisiturris karasensis Robba, 2013
 Nisiturris obliquecostata Robba, 2013
 Nisiturris piccolii Robba, 2013
 Nisiturris rembangensis Robba, 2013
 Nisiturris supramarginata Robba, 2013

Other taxa:
 genus Alaskodiscus Rohr, Frýda & Blodgett, 2013
 genus Angulathilda  Gründel & Nützel, 2013
 genus Bleytonella Gründel & Kollmann, 2013
 genus Brouzetdiscus Gründel & Kollmann, 2013
 genus Bulicingulina Robba, 2013
 genus Bulimoscilla Robba, 2013
 genus Cimrmaniela Frýda, Ferrová & Frýdová, 2013
 genus Cortana Salvador & Simone, 2013
 genus Costatomphalus Gründel & Kollmann, 2013
 genus Cyclothyrella Neubauer, Mandic, Harzhauser & Hrvatović, 2013
 genus Darwinices Griffin & Pastorino, 2013
 genus Macromargarya Ying, Fürsich & Schneider, 2013
 genus Nisipyrgiscus Robba, 2013

Marine gastropods 
Aeneator martae Araya, 2013
Aidemofusus ignotus Kosyan & Kantor, 2013
Alaginella aikeni Lussi, 2013
Anna capixaba Coltro & Dornellas, 2013
Assiminea principensis Rolán, 2013
Assiminea moroccoensis Rolán, 2013
Assiminea occulta Rolán, 2013
Assiminea saotomensis Rolán, 2013
Assiminea senegalensis Rolán, 2013
Buchema schearmani Morassi & Bonfitto, 2013
Dalliconus coletteae Petuch, 2013
Darioconus natalaurantia Veldsman, 2013
Chicoreus janae Houart, 2013
Crassispira somalica Morassi &  Bonfitto, 2013
Dauciconus jorioi Petuch, 2013
Dermomurex coonsorum Petuch, 2013
Extractrix dockeryi Harasewych & Petit, 2013
Enaeta bessei Petuch, 2013
Enaeta lindae Petuch, 2013
Engina dicksoni Petuch, 2013
Haplocochlias lupita Espinosa & Ortea, 2013
Haustellum lorenzi Houart, 2013
Iredalea adensis Morassi & Bonfitto, 2013
Jaspidiconus allamandi Petuch, 2013
Jaspidiconus exumaensis Petuch, 2013
Jaspidiconus mackintoshi Petuch, 2013
Jaspidiconus oleiniki Petuch, 2013
Jaspidiconus sargenti Petuch, 2013
Lindaconus therriaulti Petuch, 2013
Magelliconus eleutheraensis Petuch, 2013
Marginella adamsoides Lussi, 2013
Marginella kilburni Lussi, 2013
Marginella philipi Veldsman, 2013
Marginella richardsbayensis Lussi, 2013
Marginella tentoria Lussi, 2013
Marginella viljoenae Veldsman, 2013
Marginella wallaceorum Lussi, 2013
Modulus hennequini Petuch, 2013
Modulus honkerorum Petuch,2013
Murexiella deynzerorum Petuch, 2013
Muricopsis honkeri Petuch, 2013
Nassarius levis Abbate & Cavallari, 2013
Nassarius madurensis Kool, 2013
Isotriphora tigrina Fernandes, Pimenta & Leal, 2013
Isotriphora onca Fernandes, Pimenta & Leal, 2013
Oliva mooreana Petuch, 2013
Ovini petalius Simone, 2013
Phaenomenella vexabilis Fraussen & Stahlschmidt, 2013
Pictorium versicolor Strong & Bouchet, 2013
Planaxis nancyae Petuch, 2013
Pollia krauseri Tröndlé, 2013
Polygona bessei Petuch, 2013
Polygona paulae Petuch, 2013
Pustulatirus biocellatus Lyons & Snyder, 2013
Pustulatirus utilaensis Lyons & Snyder, 2013
Pustulatirus watermanorum Lyons & Snyder, 2013
Pusula bessei Petuch, 2013
Roquesia lindae Petuch, 2013
Sandericonus ednae Petuch, 2013
Stramonita buchecki Petuch, 2013
Terebra vappereaui Tröndlé, Boutet & Terryn, 2013
Thala turneri Salisbury & Gori, 2013
Tropidoturris viccondei Morassi &  Bonfitto, 2013
Vexillum beitzi Salisbury & Gori, 2013
Vexillum oteroi Salisbury & Gori, 2013
Vexillum spiculum Bozzetti, 2013
Volutopsius scotiae Fraussen, McKay, & Drewery, 2013
Zemiropsis demertziae Fraussen & Rosado, 2013

Other taxa
New genera

Americoliva Petuch, 2013
Arubaconus Petuch, 2013
Attenuiconus Petuch, 2013
Bermudaconus Petuch, 2013
Brasiliconus Petuch, 2013
Coltroconus Petuch, 2013
Kellyconus Petuch, 2013
Ovini Simone, 2013
Poremskiconus Petuch, 2013
Roquesia Petuch, 2013
Sandericonus Petuch, 2013
Tuckericonus Petuch, 2013

New subspecies
Cinctura hunteria keatonorum Petuch, 2013
Fulguropsis spiratum keysensis Petuch, 2013
Globivasum globulus whincheri Petuch, 2013
Macrocypraea cervus lindseyi Petuch, 2013
Harpa major ivojardai Cossignani, 2013
Fusinus tuberculatus priscai Bozzetti, 2013
Oliva circinata jorioi Petuch, 2013
Rhizoconus pertusus elodieallaryae Cossignani, 2013

Freshwater gastropods 
 Belgrandiella maarensis Georgiev, 2013
 Bithynia bensoni Glöer & Bössneck, 2013
 Bithynia ghodaghodiensis Glöer & Bössneck, 2013
 Bithynia prestoni Glöer & Bössneck, 2013
 Bithynia raptiensis Glöer & Bössneck, 2013
 Bithynia reharensis Glöer & Bössneck, 2013
 Bithynia subbaraoi Glöer & Bössneck, 2013
 Bosnidilhia vreloana Boeters, Glöer & Pešić, 2013
 Bythinella blidariensis Glöer, 2013
 Bythinella falniowskii Glöer, 2013
 Bythinella feheri Glöer, 2013
 Bythinella georgievi Glöer, 2013
 Bythinella rilaensis Georgiev & Glöer, 2013
 Bythinella sirbui Glöer, 2013
 Bythinella szarowskae Glöer, 2013
 Bythiospeum bechevi Georgiev & Glöer, 2013
 Bythiospeum devetakium Georgiev & Glöer, 2013
 Bythiospeum jazzi Georgiev & Glöer, 2013
 Bythiospeum kolevi Georgiev, 2013
 Bythiospeum simovi Georgiev, 2013
 Bythiospeum stoyanovi Georgiev, 2013
 Grossuana derventica Georgiev & Glöer, 2013
 Grossuana slavyanica Georgiev & Glöer, 2013
 Gyraulus egirdirensis Glöer & Girod, 2013
 Gyraulus elenae Vinarski, Glöer & Palatov, 2013
 Gyraulus kosiensis Glöer & Bössneck, 2013
 Gyraulus luguhuensis Shu, Köhler, Fu & Wang, 2013
 Gyraulus taseviensis Glöer & Girod, 2013
 Isimerope semele Radea & Parmakelis in Radea, Parmakelis, Mourikis & Triantis, 2013
 Islamia dmitroviciana Boeters, Glöer & Pešić, 2013
 Karucia sublacustrina Pešić & Glöer, 2013
 Moitessieria racamondi Callot-Girardi, 2013
 Moitessieria ripacurtiae Tarruella, Corbella, Guillén, Prats & Alba, 2013
 Pontobelgrandiella tanevi Georgiev, 2013
 Pyrgulopsis licina Hershler, Liu & Bradford, 2013
 Pyrgulopsis perforata Hershler, Liu & Bradford, 2013
 Pyrgulopsis sanchezi Hershler, Liu & Bradford, 2013
 Radomaniola feheri Georgiev, 2013
 Radomaniola strandzhica Georgiev & Glöer, 2013
 Strandzhia bythinellopenia Georgiev & Glöer, 2013

Other taxa
 Subfamily Radicinae Vinarski, 2013
 Genus Bosnidilhia Boeters, Glöer & Pešić, 2013
 Genus Isimerope Radea & Parmakelis in Radea, Parmakelis, Mourikis & Triantis, 2013
 Genus Karucia Pešić & Glöer, 2013
 Genus Montenegrospeum Pešić & Glöer, 2013
 Genus Strandzhia Georgiev & Glöer, 2013
 Subgenus Margarya (Mabillemargarya) He, 2013
 Subgenus Margarya (Tchangmargarya) He, 2013

Land gastropods 

 Abbottella calliotropis Watters, 2013
 Abbottella diadema Watters, 2013
 Abbottella dichroa Watters, 2013
 Abbottella nitens Watters, 2013
 Abbottella paradoxa Watters, 2013
 Abbottella tenebrosa Watters, 2013
 Afripupa misaliensis Gittenberger & van Bruggen, 2013
 Alopia hirschfelderi Nordsieck, 2013
 Amphidromus iunior Cilia, 2013
 Anctus prolatus Simone & Casati, 2013
 Arinia maolanensis Zhang, Chen & Zhou, 2013
 Arnhemtrachia ramingining Köhler & Criscione, 2013
 Atlasica cossignanii Ahuir Galindo, 2013
 Australdonta anneae Sartori, Gargominy & Fontaine, 2013
 Australdonta florencei Sartori, Gargominy & Fontaine, 2013
 Australdonta oheatora Sartori, Gargominy & Fontaine, 2013
 Australdonta pakalolo Sartori, Gargominy & Fontaine, 2013
 Australdonta sibleti Sartori, Gargominy & Fontaine, 2013
 Australdonta teaae Sartori, Gargominy & Fontaine, 2013
 Australocosmica rotunda Criscione & Köhler, 2013
 Australocosmica pallida Criscione & Köhler, 2013
 Australocosmica buffonensis Criscione & Köhler, 2013
 Australocosmica bernoulliensis Criscione & Köhler, 2013
 Australocosmica crassicostata Criscione & Köhler, 2013
 Australocosmica nana Criscione & Köhler, 2013
 Avakubia biokoensis de Winter & Vastenhout, 2013
 Avakubia crystallum de Winter in de Winter & Vastenhout, 2013
 Avakubia fruticicola de Winter & Vastenhout, 2013
 Avakubia occidentalis de Winter in de Winter & Vastenhout, 2013
 Avakubia ortizdezarateorum de Winter & Vastenhout, 2013
 Avakubia semenguei de Winter & Vastenhout, 2013
 Avakubia subacuminata de Winter & Vastenhout, 2013
 Cahuillus fultoni Gilbertson, Eernisse & Wallace, 2013
 Clausilia brembina alanica Nordsieck, 2013
 Clausilia umbrosa gardonensis  Nardi & Nordsieck, 2013
 Clinispira insolita Simone & Casati, 2013
 Cyclodontina capivara Simone & Casati, 2013
 Dadagulella browni mafiensis Rowson & Tattersfield, 2013
 Dadagulella browni semulikiensis Rowson & Tattersfield, 2013
 Dadagulella cresswelli Rowson & Tattersfield, 2013
 Dadagulella delta Rowson & Tattersfield, 2013
 Dadagulella ecclesiola Rowson & Tattersfield, 2013
 Dadagulella frontierarum Rowson & Tattersfield, 2013
 Dadagulella minareta Rowson & Tattersfield, 2013
 Dadagulella minuscula mahorana Rowson & Tattersfield, 2013
 Dadagulella pembensis Rowson & Tattersfield, 2013
 Denhamiana laetifica Stanisic, 2013
 Denhamiana leichhardti Stanisic, 2013
 Diplommatina insularis Tongkerd & Panha in  Tongkerd, Sutcharit & Panha, 2013
 Drusia alexantoni Martínez-Ortí & Borredà, 2013
 Elia novorossica nagolnica Balashov, 2013
 Euglandina irakita Jardim, Abbate & Simone, 2013
 Gastrocopta sp. CW1 (nomen nudum)
 Gudeodiscus concavus Páll-Gergely in Páll-Gergely & Hunyadi, 2013
 Gudeodiscus emigrans otanii Páll-Gergely in Páll-Gergely & Hunyadi, 2013
 Gudeodiscus emigrans quadrilamellatus Páll-Gergely in Páll-Gergely & Hunyadi, 2013
 Gudeodiscus eroessi eroessi Páll-Gergely & Hunyadi, 2013
 Gudeodiscus eroessi fuscus Páll-Gergely & Hunyadi, 2013
 Gudeodiscus eroessi hemisculptus Páll-Gergely in Páll-Gergely & Hunyadi, 2013
 Gudeodiscus giardi oharai Páll-Gergely in Páll-Gergely & Hunyadi, 2013
 Gudeodiscus giardi szekeresi Páll-Gergely & Hunyadi, 2013
 Gudeodiscus goliath Páll-Gergely & Hunyadi, 2013
 Gudeodiscus okuboi Páll-Gergely & Hunyadi, 2013
 Gudeodiscus phlyarius werneri Páll-Gergely & Hunyadi, 2013
 Gudeodiscus pulvinaris robustus Páll-Gergely & Hunyadi, 2013
 Gudeodiscus soosi Páll-Gergely in Páll-Gergely & Hunyadi, 2013
 Gudeodiscus ursula Páll-Gergely & Hunyadi, 2013
 Gudeodiscus yanghaoi Páll-Gergely & Hunyadi, 2013
 Gudeodiscus yunnanensis Páll-Gergely in Páll-Gergely & Hunyadi, 2013
 Gyliotrachela phoca Tongkerd & Panha in  Tongkerd, Sutcharit & Panha, 2013
 Habeas corpus Simone, 2013
 Habeas data Simone, 2013
 Habeas priscus Simone, 2013
 Hungerfordia echinata echinata Yamazaki & Ueshima in Yamazaki, Yamazaki & Ueshima, 2013
 Hungerfordia echinata tubulispina Yamazaki & Ueshima in Yamazaki, Yamazaki & Ueshima, 2013
 Hungerfordia elegantissima Yamazaki & Ueshima in Yamazaki, Yamazaki & Ueshima, 2013
 Hungerfordia expansilabris Yamazaki & Ueshima in Yamazaki, Yamazaki & Ueshima, 2013
 Hungerfordia goniobasis dmasechensis Yamazaki & Ueshima in Yamazaki, Yamazaki & Ueshima, 2013
 Hungerfordia goniobasis goniobasis Yamazaki & Ueshima in Yamazaki, Yamazaki & Ueshima, 2013
 Hungerfordia nudicollum Yamazaki & Ueshima in Yamazaki, Yamazaki & Ueshima, 2013
 Hungerfordia papilio papilio Yamazaki & Ueshima in Yamazaki, Yamazaki & Ueshima, 2013
 Hungerfordia papilio stenoptera Yamazaki & Ueshima in Yamazaki, Yamazaki & Ueshima, 2013
 Hungerfordia pteropurpuroides Yamazaki & Ueshima in Yamazaki, Yamazaki & Ueshima, 2013
 Hungerfordia subalata Yamazaki & Ueshima in Yamazaki, Yamazaki & Ueshima, 2013
 Hungerfordia triplochilus Yamazaki & Ueshima in Yamazaki, Yamazaki & Ueshima, 2013
 Iberus calaensis Ahuir Galindo, 2013
 Landouria omphalostoma Páll-Gergely & Hunyadi in Páll-Gergely, Hunyadi & Asami, 2013
 Leiabbottella thompsoni Watters, 2013
 Loxana ksibaensis Ahuir Galindo, 2013
 Megalobulimus florezi 
 Metafruticicola crassicosta Bank, Gittenberger & Neubert, 2013
 Metafruticicola monticola Bank, Gittenberger & Neubert, 2013
 Metafruticicola nicosiana maasseni Bank, Gittenberger & Neubert, 2013
 Metafruticicola ottmari Bank, Gittenberger & Neubert, 2013
 Metafruticicola pieperi Bank, Gittenberger & Neubert, 2013
 Metafruticicola rugosissima Bank, Gittenberger & Neubert, 2013
 Metafruticicola uluborluensis Bank, Gittenberger & Neubert, 2013
 Microcystina rowsoni Gittenberger & van Bruggen, 2013
 Minidonta bieleri Sartori, Gargominy & Fontaine, 2013
 Minidonta boucheti Sartori, Gargominy & Fontaine, 2013
 Nanotrachia carinata Köhler & Criscione, 2013
 Nanotrachia coronata Köhler & Criscione, 2013ref name=Koehler/>
 Nanotrachia costulata Köhler & Criscione, 2013
 Nanotrachia levis Köhler & Criscione, 2013
 Napaeus doloresae Santana in Santana, Artiles, Yanes, Deniz, Alonso & Ibáñez, 2013
 Napaeus estherae Artiles in Santana, Artiles, Yanes, Deniz, Alonso & Ibáñez, 2013
 Napaeus magnus Yanes, Deniz, Alonso & Ibáñez in Santana, Artiles, Yanes, Deniz, Alonso & Ibáñez, 2013
 Nesiocina abdoui Richling & Bouchet, 2013
 Nesiocina gambierensis Richling & Bouchet, 2013
 Nesiocina grohi Richling & Bouchet, 2013
 Nesiocina mangarevae Richling & Bouchet, 2013
 Nesiocina pauciplicata Richling & Bouchet, 2013
 Nesiocina pazi Richling & Bouchet, 2013
 Nesiocina superoperculata Richling & Bouchet, 2013
 Nesiocina trilamellata Richling & Bouchet, 2013
 Nesiocina unilamellata Richling & Bouchet, 2013
 Nodulabium solidum Criscione & Köhler, 2013
 Omphalotropis ilapiryensis Pearce & Paustian, 2013
 Ototrachia compressa Criscione & Köhler, 2013
 Oxychilus viridescens Martins, Brito & Backeljau, 2013
 Oxychona maculata Salvador & Cavallari, 2013
 Papillifera solida diabolina Nordsieck, 2013
 Papillifera solida pseudobidens Nordsieck, 2013
 Pearsonia tembatensis Marzuki & Clements, 2013

 Perrottetia aquilonaris Siriboon & Panha in Siriboon, Sutcharit, Naggs & Panha, 2013
 Perrottetia dermapyrrhosa Siriboon & Panha in Siriboon, Sutcharit, Naggs & Panha, 2013
 Perrottetia phuphamanensis Siriboon & Panha in Siriboon, Sutcharit, Naggs & Panha, 2013
 Petraeomastus qii Wang & Wu, 2013
 Platyla jordai Altaba, 2013
 Pollicaria mouhoti monochroma Kongim, Sutcharit, Naggs & Panha, 2013
 Pseudoavakubia atewaensis de Winter in de Winter & Vastenhout, 2013
 Pseudoavakubia majus de Winter & Vastenhout, 2013
 Pseudoavakubia ghanaensis de Winter in de Winter & Vastenhout, 2013
 Pseudoavakubia liberiana de Winter in de Winter & Vastenhout, 2013
 Pseudomesodontrachia gregoriana Criscione & Köhler, 2013
 Pupisoma misaliensis Gittenberger & van Bruggen, 2013
 Rhinus gilbertus Simone & Casati, 2013
 Schileykula maculata Páll-Gergely & Asami, 2013
 Serina denticulata Wu & Xu, 2013
 Serina schileykoi Fang & Wu, 2013
 Siciliaria vulcanica sigridae Nordsieck, 2013
 Sicradiscus feheri Páll-Gergely & Hunyadi, 2013
 Sicradiscus transitus Páll-Gergely, 2013
 Sinicola asamiana Páll-Gergely, 2013
 Sinicola schmackeri Páll-Gergely, 2013
 Sinicola stenomphala Páll-Gergely & Hunyadi, 2013
 Sinoennea stunensis Dumrongrojwattana & Wongkamhaeng, 2013
 Stephacharopa calderaensis Miquel & Araya, 2013
 Streptartemon molaris Simone & Casati, 2013
 Sturanya makaroaensis Richling & Bouchet, 2013
 Truncatellina bhutanensis 
 Vertigo marciae Nekola & Rosenberg, 2013
 Vitrea saboorii Neubert & Bössneck, 2013
 Zospeum tholussum Weigand, 2013

Other taxa
 Genus Clinispira Simone & Casati, 2013
 Genus Dadagulella Rowson & Tattersfield, 2013
 Genus Denhamiana Stanisic, 2013
 Genus Gudediscus Páll-Gergely in Páll-Gergely & Hunyadi, 2013
 Genus Habeas Simone, 2013
 Genus Nanotrachia Köhler & Criscione, 2013
 Genus Nesiocina Richling & Bouchet, 2013
 Genus Nodulabium Criscione & Köhler, 2013
 Genus Ototrachia Criscione & Köhler, 2013
 Genus Pseudoavakubia de Winter & Vastenhout, 2013
 Genus Pseudomesodontrachia Criscione & Köhler, 2013
 Genus Sicradiscus Páll-Gergely, 2013
 Genus Stephacharopa Miquel & Araya, 2013
 Genus Vegrandinia Salvador, Cunha & Simone, 2013
 Genus Vincentrachia Criscione & Köhler, 2013
 Subgenus Orcula (Hausdorfia) Páll-Gergely & Irikov in Páll-Gergely, Deli, Irikov & Harl, 2013
 Subgenus Orcula (Illyriobanatica) Páll-Gergely & Deli in Páll-Gergely, Deli, Irikov & Harl, 2013
 Subgenus Metafruticicola (Rothifruticicola) Bank, Gittenberger & Neubert, 2013

See also 
 List of gastropods described in 2012
 List of gastropods described in 2014

References 

Gastropods